Dmitry Ivanovich Sanakoyev (born 10 May 1969 in Tskhinvali, South Ossetian Autonomous Oblast, Georgian SSR, Soviet Union) is a South Ossetian and Georgian politician, a former official in the secessionist government of South Ossetia and later, from 2007 to 2022, served as the Head of the Provisional Administration of South Ossetia, a rival entity established in the Georgian-controlled territories in the South Ossetia region by the Georgian government.

Early life and career 
Sanakoyev was born in Tskhinvali, in what was then the South Ossetian Autonomous Oblast of the Georgian SSR. He graduated from the South Ossetian Pedagogical State Institute in 1993, and served as a Soviet army officer in Lithuania from 1987 to 1989. In the 1991-1992 war between Georgian forces and secessionist militias he fought on the Ossetian side. In 1993-1996 worked in the South Ossetian de facto defence ministry. In 1996 he was appointed defence minister and in 1998 vice prime minister. In July 2001 he became prime minister of South Ossetia, serving until December 2001, when Eduard Kokoity replaced Lyudvig Chibirov as South Ossetia’s leader.

Defection to Georgia 
During the 2006 South Ossetian presidential elections, on November 13, in a so-called "alternative" poll organized by The Salvation Union of South Ossetia in Georgian- and Ossetian villages not controlled by the separatists, Sanakoyev was declared the president-elect, with more than 80 percent of the vote. His campaign posters were prominently posted on walls outside polling stations in Georgian-controlled villages, and benefited from extensive media coverage in the Georgian press. His election manifesto envisaged the restoration of the region's status as an autonomous republic within Georgia and a program of measures to spur economic growth.

At a press conference on November 13, 2006, Kokoity termed Sanakoyev and Karkusov, head of the alternative election commission and a former adviser to Kokoity, "traitors to their homeland and traitors to the South Ossetian people." The South Ossetian media launched a campaign to discredit and compromise Sanakoyev, accusing him of corruption, duplicity, and collaborating with Georgian intelligence.

In December 2006, Sanakoyev formed a government, choosing not to appoint a defense minister.

On May 10, 2007, Sanakoyev was appointed by the President of Georgia as the Head of South Ossetian Provisional Administrative Entity. The next day Sanakoyev addressed the Parliament of Georgia in Ossetic, outlining his vision for a resolution of the conflict in South Ossetia ( full text). The move earned praise from the United States State Department, but alarmed the de facto authorities in Tskhinvali, which ordered the blocking of traffic to ethnic Georgian villages and threatened to oust Sanakoyev’s government by force, moves that received the disapproval of the Russian government.

On June 26, 2007, Sanakoyev delivered a speech, in his native Ossetian, at the EU-Georgian Parliamentary Cooperation Committee in Brussels, his first appeal to the international community. He emphasized that "a direct dialogue between the Georgian and Ossetian peoples, and demilitarization of the region, are of crucial importance... The European type of autonomy, like in South Tyrol, can serve as a model... in unified Georgia... where liberal democracy is being built".

On July 3, 2008, Sanakoyev survived an attack on the convoy he was traveling in when it hit a remote-controlled mine. Both Sanakoyev’s administration and Georgian police officials blamed forces loyal to Kokoity's separatist government of South Ossetia for organizing the incident, but a representative of that government denied any connection with the attack.

References

Georgia: South Ossetia Seeks To Contain Opposition Challenge - Radio Free Europe/Radio Liberty.
EurasiaNet Eurasia Insight - Georgia’s South Ossetia: One Unrecognized State, Two Unrecognized Governments
South Ossetia Ripped in Two - Kommersant Moscow - Kommersant.

External links
Provisional administration website

1969 births
Living people
Ossetian people
Prime Ministers of South Ossetia
People from Tskhinvali
People of South Ossetia for Peace politicians